Coshocton Tribune is a daily newspaper that serves the community of Coshocton, Ohio, United States, and the surrounding Coshocton County.

History
The Coshocton Tribune was founded in 1909 by William J. Bahmer, a former teacher. The paper was independently owned until 1960, when it was sold to Thompson Newspapers. In 2000, it was sold to Gannett.

References

External links 
Coshocton Tribune website

Newspapers published in Ohio
Coshocton County, Ohio
Gannett publications
1909 establishments in Ohio